Donald André Bly (born May 22, 1977) is a former American football cornerback who played in the National Football League (NFL) for eleven seasons. He played college football for the University of North Carolina (UNC), and earned All-American honors twice. Bly was drafted by the St. Louis Rams in the second round of the 1999 NFL Draft, and spent four seasons with the Rams, earning a Super Bowl ring with them in Super Bowl XXXIV over the Tennessee Titans. He was selected to two Pro Bowls during his four-year tenure with the Detroit Lions, and also played for the Denver Broncos and San Francisco 49ers.

He most-recently served as the cornerbacks coach for the University of North Carolina Tar Heels football team, before his departure in 2023

Early years
Bly was born in Portsmouth, Virginia.  He graduated from Western Branch High School in Chesapeake, where he was an all-state high school football player as well as a decorated baseball player for Western Branch Bruins.

College career
Bly attended the University of North Carolina at Chapel Hill, where he played for the North Carolina Tar Heels football team.  In his redshirt freshman season at UNC, he led the nation with 11 interceptions. He received all-American honors, and at the time was only one of five players in NCAA history to achieve this honor as a freshman (Tony Dorsett, Herschel Walker, Bjorn Merten, and Marshall Faulk being the others). Bly was the only football player in UNC and Atlantic Coast Conference (ACC) history to receive consensus first-team All-America honors twice in his college career.  In his sophomore year, he was one of three finalists for the Bronko Nagurski National Defensive Player of the Year Award.  Bly set the ACC record for career interceptions (20), which was later broken by Alphonso Smith of Wake Forest (21). He was elected to the College Football Hall of Fame in 2014.

Professional career

Pre-draft

St. Louis Rams
The St. Louis Rams selected Bly in the second round of the 1999 NFL Draft. Bly started his career in St. Louis, playing there for four years. In his 1999 rookie season, Bly was the third cornerback or nickel back on the Rams roster, behind Todd Lyght and Dexter McCleon. While with the Rams, Bly won a Super Bowl ring for Super Bowl XXXIV. In the 2001 season, Bly notched six interceptions and led the NFL with 150 return yards. In Super Bowl XXXVI, the Rams lost to the New England Patriots, marking Bly's second Super Bowl with St. Louis.

First stint with Lions
In 2003, Bly became a free agent, left the St. Louis Rams, and signed with the Detroit Lions on a five-year contract, reportedly  worth $24.5 million with a $6 million signing bonus. He made the Pro Bowl in two of his seasons with the team. Bly was the 2003 recipient of the Detroit Lions/Detroit Sports Broadcasters Association/Pro Football Writers Association's Media-Friendly "Good Guy" Award. The Good Guy Award is given yearly to the Detroit Lions player who shows consideration to, and cooperation with the media at all times during the course of the season.

On November 29, 2005, the day after Lions head coach Steve Mariucci was fired, Bly told the NFL Network that if their back-up quarterback, Jeff Garcia, had been healthy the entire season,  the Lions would be in a better situation, and Mariucci would still be coaching the team. He has since apologized, albeit not to Joey Harrington, the Lions starting quarterback that season.

Denver Broncos
On March 1, 2007, Bly was traded by the Detroit Lions to the Denver Broncos for running back Tatum Bell, offensive tackle George Foster, and a 5th round draft pick. On March 28, 2007, the Denver Broncos and Bly agreed to a 5-year, $33 million contract. The contract included $18 million in bonus money and $16 million guaranteed. Bly finished the 2007 season as the Broncos leader in interceptions with five.

The Broncos restructured Bly's contract on February 18, 2008 to free up salary cap space and keep Bly on the team. As of December 1, Bly had a total of 98 tackles and 7 interceptions with the Broncos.

The Broncos released Bly on February 17, 2009.

Later career
On May 21, 2009, Bly signed a one-year, $845,000 contract with the San Francisco 49ers.
On July 2, 2010, Bly re-signed with the Detroit Lions, but was released on September 4.

NFL career statistics

Coaching career
In October 2018, Bly was named the defensive backs coach for the San Diego Fleet of the Alliance of American Football. However, in December, he joined the North Carolina Tar Heels coaching staff as their cornerbacks coach. He and North Carolina mutually parted ways on January 11, 2023. He was hired by the Detroit Lions as their cornerbacks coach on February 2, 2023.

Personal life
Bly and his wife Kristyn, have four sons: Trey, Jordan, AJ, and Emanuel and a daughter, Peyton. Bly also has an older sister Donna Mitchell, who is a high school teacher. Bly was voted into the Virginia Sports Hall of Fame in January 2017. His nephew, Josh Downs, currently plays for Carolina where he is the team's top receiver.

References

External links
 
 Detroit Lions bio

1977 births
Living people
All-American college football players
American football cornerbacks
College Football Hall of Fame inductees
Denver Broncos players
Detroit Lions players
National Conference Pro Bowl players
North Carolina Tar Heels football coaches
North Carolina Tar Heels football players
Players of American football from Virginia
San Francisco 49ers players
St. Louis Rams players
Sportspeople from Chesapeake, Virginia
Detroit Lions coaches